Laboum (stylized as LABOUM) is a South Korean girl group currently under Interpark Music Plus.  They debuted in 2014 under NH Media and Nega Network's joint venture Global H. Their name is taken from the French term meaning "The Party".

History

2014: Debut with Petit Macaron
In August 2014, NH Media and Nega Network announced the upcoming debut girl group Laboum, who had been training for four years. The group was touted as a sister group to NH Media's U-KISS and Nega Network's Brown Eyed Girls.

Laboum released their debut single album  Petit Macaron on August 28, 2014, following the release of their music video for title track "Pit-A-Pat" the day before. The song was written by Seo Ji-eum, known for hits such as f(x)'s "Electric Shock" and TaeTiSeo's "Twinkle", and composed by Jung Jae-yeob.

On October 24, Laboum announced that they would come back with Petit Macaron DATA PACK, a Petit Macaron re-release with extra digital contents, and a reworking of the track "What About You?". On October 31, the group held a comeback performance on Music Bank and released the song's music video, which featured a clockwork doll theme. Petit Macaron DATA PACK was released on November 3.

2015: Sugar Sugar and Aalow Aalow
In late February 2015, ZN was cast to star opposite U-KISS' Kevin in the two "Milky Love" episodes of the omnibus web drama About Love. Both episodes were released on March 2 on Naver TV Cast.

On March 16, Laboum announced they would come back with a more mature yet refreshing concept in "Sugar Sugar", which would feature a slumber party theme. Their second single album "Sugar Sugar" was released on August 14. Yujeong was a guest on a May episode of the popular radio program Kiss the Radio, hosted by Super Junior.

In June, Solbin was cast in the variety series Her Secret Weapon. The show focused on lesser-known girl group members and ranked them based on their performance in certain tasks that highlight the qualities female idols need to generate loyal fans. Out of ten contestants, Solbin tied with Berry Good's Taeha for sixth place.

On November 26, 2015, Laboum uploaded a music video teaser for the comeback single "Aalow Aalow" to the group's official YouTube channel. The video was released on December 1 and featured an elegant, yet funky retro style. On December 4, Laboum held a comeback stage for "Aalow Aalow" on Music Bank. The single album was officially released on December 6.

2016–2017: Fresh Adventure, Love Sign, Miss This Kiss and Yulhee's departure

On February 15, 2016, Laboum launched a campaign to fund their upcoming music video on the crowdfunding platform Makestar. Among other rewards, the group offered an "Honorary Producer" title in the music video credits to those who donated over a certain amount. The campaign reached its goal of $8,261 in just four hours.

The makestar campaign ultimately raised $27,832 – 336.9% of its original goal. Laboum released the music video for "Journey to Atlantis" and its accompanying fourth single album Fresh Adventure on April 6, 2016.

On August 23, 2016, Laboum's first mini album Love Sign was released. The album consists of six tracks, including the lead single "Shooting Love".

On December 2, 2016, Laboum released their winter digital single Winter Story.

On April 17, 2017, their second mini album Miss This Kiss was released with the lead track "Hwi Hwi". They took home their first music show win on Music Bank on April 28, 2017, with "Hwi Hwi". The album was crowdfunded on the platform Makestar; the campaign raised $75,751.58 – 849.93% over its original goal.

On July 25, 2017, Laboum released their summer digital single Laboum Summer Special with lead single "Only U".

ZN, Yujeong, and Haein appeared on KBS Idol Rebooting Project The Unit, which first aired on October 28, 2017.

On November 3, 2017, NH Media confirmed the departure of Yulhee from the group and terminated her contract.

2018–2019: The Unit, Between Us, Japanese debut, I'm Yours, and Two of Us
On February 10, 2018, the finale for The Unit was held live at COEX Stadium, with ZN ranked #8. ZN promoted briefly as a member of the show's winning girl group, UNI.T. She was unable to take part in the group's second and final album, "Begin with the End" due to Laboum's conflicting schedules.

On July 9, a teaser image for the group's single album, Between Us was released. The following day, it was revealed that the single was produced by member Soyeon, and that all five members would participate in promotional activities.

The group released its debut Japanese single "Hwi Hwi" on November 7, 2018, under Nippon Columbia. The single reached No. 9 on the Oricon charts.

Laboum's sixth single album was released on December 5, 2018, with the lead single "Turn It On".

Laboum released their first studio album Two of Us with the title track "Firework" on September 19, 2019. The comeback was also backed by Makestar, achieving 529% of its original goal, and earning $43,283.28 from participants.

On December 21, Laboum came out with a rearranged version of their song 'Fresh Adventure' as 'Fresh Adventure Winter ++' for Christmas. This was the group's third digital single.

2020–present: "Smile Pop Pop", sudden success with "Journey to Atlantis", Yujeong's departure, Blossom and group hiatus 
Member Yujeong shared a teaser image on August 25, 2020, in an Instagram story that revealed a collaborative music video between Laboum and Chinese children's franchise BabyBus, for a song titled 'Smile Pop Pop'. On the same day, the song was released digitally.

On September 1, 2020, Laboum's company Global H Media confirmed that Laboum is scheduled to make a comeback with a mini-album in October 2020, but the comeback never materialized.

Two days after the announcement, on September 3, 2020, the music video for "Smile Pop Pop" got released through the 'SUPER SOUND Bugs' YouTube channel.

On December 24, 2020, Laboum released their fourth digital single "Cheese".

In March 2021, the 2016 song "Journey to Atlantis" was heavily featured in Hangout with Yoo, a Korean variety show program, causing the song to reappear on Korean music charts and steadily rose in position on several real-time charts. In response, the group resumed promotional activities for the song in June 2021. Following the success of "Journey to Atlantis", "Aalow Aalow" also peaked #163, six years after releasing

On September 8, Yujeong posted a handwritten letter on Instagram, announcing that she was going to leave the group after her contract expired. She also announced that Soyeon, ZN, Solbin and Haein have renewed their contracts, and that Laboum would continue as a quartet. In addition, it was announced that the remaining members has departed from their current agency and signed with Interpark Music Plus, a subsidiary of Interpark.

On October 6, it was announced that Laboum would be making their comeback as a four-member group in early November.  ZN will be using the name Jinyea for future activities moving forward.  It was later announced that Laboum will be releasing their third EP Blossom on November 3.

On December 17, Laboum released the winter digital single "White Love", featuring Layone.

On March 10, 2022, it was confirmed that Laboum would release a new album in April 2022, though it never materialized.

In May 2022, Interpark Music Plus announced that Laboum would be attending the NO WAR Peace Concert', to be held on May 17, to inform the horrors of the Ukrainian war and to awaken the preciousness of peace. giving hope to many people suffering from war.

On August 11, 2022, it was speculated by news outlets that LABOUM would be disbanding at the end of August due to the recent acquisition of Interpark by Yanolja, as they had no intentions to continue managing the group. Later on the same day, a representative from Interpark Music Plus clarified that the group's disbandment has not been confirmed.

On September 23, Joynews24 reported that LABOUM would go on an indefinite hiatus to focus on individual activities. Even though the members are looking for new agencies, they are reportedly interested in conducting group activities as LABOUM alongside their individual activities.

According to the DAUM web portal, HaeIn has signed a contract to be represented by the agency R&D Company.

On February 27, 2023, Jinyea has signed an exclusive contract with Blade Entertainment.

Members

Current
 Yujeong (유정)
 Soyeon (소연)
 Jinyea (진예)
 Haein (해인)
 Solbin (솔빈)

Former
 Yulhee (율희)

Timeline

Discography

Studio albums

Extended plays

Single albums

Singles

Soundtrack appearances

Collaborations

Videography

Music videos

Ambassadorship 
 Public Relations Ambassador Gangnam-gu (2021)

Filmography

Television Series

Variety shows

Reality show

Awards and nominations

Notes

References

External links

 

K-pop music groups
Musical groups established in 2014
South Korean dance music groups
South Korean girl groups
2014 establishments in South Korea
Nippon Columbia artists